The Cape Verde – Senegal Maritime Delimitation Treaty is a treaty between Cape Verde and Senegal in which the two states agreed to the delimitation of their maritime boundary.

The treaty was signed on February 17, 1993.  The boundary set out by the text of the treaty identifies a line which trends north-south for approximately 150 nm. in seven maritime segments defined by eight specific coordinate points. The boundary lies approximately 9 nm. to 20 nm. east of an equidistant line between the two territories.

The official name for the treaty is Treaty on the Delimitation of the Maritime Frontier between the Republic of Cape Verde and the Republic of Senegal.

References

External links
Full text of treaty

Treaties concluded in 1993
1993 in Cape Verde
1993 in Senegal
Borders of Cape Verde
Borders of Senegal
Boundary treaties
Treaties of Cape Verde
Treaties of Senegal
United Nations treaties